The Conimbricenses were an important collection of Jesuit commentaries on Aristotle compiled at University of Coimbra in Coimbra, Portugal.

Commentaries
The Coimbra Commentaries, also known as the Conimbricenses or Cursus Conimbricenses, are a group of 11 books on Aristotle (only eight can be called commentaries). They were produced as part of King John III of Portugal's efforts to make the University of Coimbra rival the University of Paris.  The names of 200 Jesuits, including those of professors and students, appeared repeatedly on the college registries. From the late 16th to the early 17th centuries, the university produced voluminous commentaries on Aristotle's philosophical writings. The commentaries were, in fact, dictated to the students by the professors and so were not intended for publication. After they were published anyway, to interpret and disown incorrect and unauthorized editions, Claudio Acquaviva, the General of the Society of Jesus, assigned Pedro da Fonseca, the provincial of the Portuguese province, the task of supervising the revision of the commentaries for authorized publication. Fonseca was called "the Aristotle of Portugal" by Charles George Herbermann in his Catholic Encyclopedia.

Contents
The treatises appeared in the following order:

 Commentarii, Collegii, Conimbricenses, Societatis, Jesu in octo, libros Physicorum, Aristotelis, Stagyritæ, (Coimbra, 1591, reprint Hildesheim, Georg Olms, 1984);
 Commentarii, Collegii, Conimbricenses, Societatis, Jesu in quattuor, libros, Physicorum, Aristotelis de Cœlo (Coimbra, 1592);
 Commentarii Collegii Conimbricensis Societatis Jesu in libros Meteororum Aristotelis Stagyritæ (Coimbra, 1592);
 Commentarii Collegii Conimbricensis Societatis Jesu in libros Aristotelis qui Parva naturalia appelantur (Coimbra, 1592);
 Commentarii Collegii Conimbricensis Societatis Jesu in libros Ethicorum Aristotelis ad Nichomachum aliquot Cursus Conimbricensis disputationes in quibus præcipua quaedam Ethicæ disciplinæ capita continentur (Coimbra, 1595);
 Commentarii Collegii Conimbricensis Societatis Jesu in duos libros Aristotelis De generatione et corruptione (Coimbra, 1595, reprint Hildesheim, Georg Olms, 2003);
 Commentarii Collegii Conimbricensis Societatis Jesu in tres libros Aristotelis De Anima (Coimbra, 1592 reprint Hildesheim, Georg Olms, 2006). This treatise was published after the death of Father Emmanuel Golz (whom Father Fonseca had commissioned to publish the earlier volumes) by Father Comas Maggalliano (Magalhaens). He added a treatise of Father Balthazaar Alvarez De Anima Separata and his own work Tractatio aliquot problematum ad quinque Sensus Spectantium;
 Commentarii Collegii Conimbricensis Societatis Jesu In universam dialecticam nunc primum (ed. Venice, 1606, reprint Hildesheim, Georg Olms, 1976) The works commented are In Isagogem Porphyry, In libros Categoriarium Aristotelis, In libros Aristotelis de Interpretatione, In libros Aristotelis Stagiritae de Priori Resolutione, In primum librum Posteriorum Aristotelis, In librum primum Topicorum Aristotelis and In duos libros Elenchorum Aristotelis.

A foreword prefixed the last treatise and disowned any connection with the work published at Frankfurt in 1604 and claiming to be the "Commentarii Conimbricenses". It reads in part, "Before we could finish the task entrusted to us of editing our Logic, to which we were bound by many promises, certain German publishers fraudulently brought out a work professing to be from us, abounding in errors and inaccuracies which were really their own. They also substituted for our commentaries certain glosses gotten furtively. It is true these writings thirty years previously were the work of one of our professors not indeed intended for publication. They were the fruit of his zeal and he never dreamed they would appear in print".

The last treatise was prepared for printing by Father Sebastian Couto. The eight parts formed five quarto volumes in wide circulation and appeared in many editions. The best known were those of Lyon, Lisbon and Cologne. The Commentaries are in Latin and are supplemented by reliable explanations of the text and an exhaustive discussion of the Aristotelian system.

Translation
 The Conimbricenses. Some Questions on Signs, Milwaukee: Marquette University Press 2001. (Translation with an introduction and notes by John P. Doyle of the commentary to the first chapter of Aristotle's De Interpretatione; "Foreword" 'A New Determination of the Middle Ages' by John Deely.)

See also
Pedro da Fonseca (philosopher)
School of Salamanca

References

External links
 Conimbricenses.org - Digital Project on the Conimbricenses, funded at the Institute for Philosophical Studies (IEF) of at University of Coimbra
 The Latin texts of the Commentaries (PDF)
 Introductory note to the Commentaries by António Manuel Martins
 Bibliography by Mário Santiago de Carvalho
 In libro de generatione et corruptione, In octo libros physicorum, In libros meteorum, In libro de anima in PDF or JPEG format at University of Coimbra’s site.

16th-century Latin-language writers
17th-century Latin-language writers
Ethical schools and movements
Jesuit education
Latin commentators on Aristotle
Scholasticism
University of Coimbra